The 1994 NCAA Division I Men's Golf Championships were contested at the 55th annual NCAA-sanctioned golf tournament for determining the individual and team national champions of men's collegiate golf at the Division I level in the United States.

The tournament was held at the Stonebridge Country Club in McKinney, Texas, a suburb of Dallas.

Stanford won the team championship, the Cardinal's seventh NCAA title and first since 1953.

Future professional and one-time major winner Justin Leonard, from Texas, won the individual title.

Individual results

Individual champion
 Justin Leonard, Texas (271)

Team results

Finalists

Eliminated after 36 holes

DC = Defending champions
Debut appearance

References

NCAA Men's Golf Championship
Golf in Texas
NCAA Golf Championship
NCAA Golf Championship
NCAA Golf Championship